The 1983 Dora Mavor Moore Awards celebrated excellence in theatre from the Toronto Alliance for the Performing Arts.

Winners and nominees

General Theatre Division

Musical Theatre or Revue Division

Theatre for Young Audiences Division

See also
37th Tony Awards
1983 Laurence Olivier Awards

References

1983 in Toronto
Dora Awards, 1983
Dora Mavor Moore Awards ceremonies